Executive Order 13492, titled Review and Disposition of Individuals Detained at the Guantánamo Bay Naval Base and Closure of Detention Facilities, is an Executive Order that was signed by United States President Barack Obama on 22 January 2009, ordering the closure of the Guantanamo Bay detention camp in Cuba. This was signed at the same time as Executive Order 13493, in which Obama ordered the identification of alternative venues for the detainees.

Background 
The Executive Order instructed for the immediate review of the statuses of all individuals detained at the Guantanamo Bay naval base, with the intent to move them out of the facility (either by transferring them, prosecuting them, or by other "lawful means, consistent with the national security and foreign policy interests of the United States and the interests of justice"), followed by closure of detention facilities "as soon as practicable, and no later than 1 year from the date of this order". 

As of January 2021, the facility remains open, with 40 individuals in custody there.

References

External links 

 Summary and Full Text of Executive Order 13492 from the Global Legal Information Network

Executive orders of Barack Obama
Guantanamo Bay detention camp